William Robert Brady (born May 25, 1956) is an American former politician who served in the Kansas State Senate and Kansas House of Representatives. He was born and raised in Parsons, Kansas, and was originally elected to the State House in 1980. He was re-elected five times, and resigned his seat in 1991 to replace Mike Johnston in the State Senate. He won re-election to the Senate in his own right in 1992, and served until 1996.

References

Democratic Party Kansas state senators
Democratic Party members of the Kansas House of Representatives
20th-century American politicians
People from Parsons, Kansas
1956 births
Living people